Idalus sublineata is a moth of the family Erebidae. It was described by Walter Rothschild in 1917. It is found in Peru.

References

sublineata
Moths described in 1917